A list of films produced in Argentina in 1948:

External links and references
 Argentine films of 1948 at the Internet Movie Database

1948
Films
Argentine